Persiaran Sultan BSA1 is the longest municipal driveway (highway) in Shah Alam, Selangor, Malaysia. The driveway connects the Sultan Salahuddin Abdul Aziz Shah Building at the north to Bulatan Jubli Perak at the south. This driveway is maintained by the Shah Alam City Council or Majlis Bandaraya Shah Alam (MBSA)

List of junctions

Highways in Malaysia
Shah Alam
Transport in Selangor